Mount Mueller may refer to the following mountains:

 Mount Mueller (Antarctica), in Enderby Land
 Mount Mueller (New Zealand)
 Mount Mueller (Tasmania), Australia
 Mount Mueller (Victoria), Australia